Ayoka Olufunmilayo Adebambo is a Nigerian scientist and professor of Animal Breeding and Genetics. She is the first female professor of Animal Breeding and Genetics. In September 2010, she was awarded the status of a Fellow of the Animal Science Association of Nigeria (ASAN).

Career
Professor Ayoka started her career at the University of Ibadan as a demonstrator before moving to the Institute of Agricultural Research and Training of the Obafemi Awolowo University, Ile-Ife. While at Ile-Ife, she focused on improving pig breeds for the purpose of commercialization. In 1993, she moved to the Department of Animal Breeding and Genetics, Federal University of Agriculture, Abeokuta, Nigeria. She is currently a member of the University's Governing Council.

Awards and recognition
In 2010, Ayoka received the award of Fellow of the Animal Science Association of Nigeria (ASAN) alongside other scientists. She was listed in Silverbird TV's 16 prominent Nigerian women in Science and Research. Ayoka also received the British Council Award and the Commonwealth Fellowship.

Publications

 Application of principal component and discriminant analyses to morpho-structural indices of indigenous and exotic chickens raised under intensive management system
 Effect of crossbreeding on fertility, hatchability and embryonic mortality of Nigerian local chickens
 Genotype effect on distribution pattern of maternally derived antibody against Newcastle disease in Nigerian local chickens
 Effect of Chicken Genotype on Growth Performance of Pure and Crossbred Progenies in the Development of a Broiler Line
 Genetic Diversity of zyxin and TNFRSF1A genes in Nigerian Local Chickens and Nera Black Chickens
 Polymorphism of IGF-1 Promoter and the UTR Regions of Nigerian Locally Adapted Chickens
 APPLICATION OF MULTIVARIATE PRINCIPAL COMPONENT ANALYSIS TO MORPHOLOGICAL CHARACTERIZATION OF INDIGENOUS GOATS IN SOUTHERN NIGERIA
 ANIMAL BREEDS: A NATION HERITAGE

External links
 https://unaab.edu.ng/prof-adebambo-ayoka-olufunmilayo/
 https://www.researchgate.net/profile/Olufunmilayo-Adebambo
 https://www.wikidata.org/wiki/Q93872525
 https://angr.org.ng/national-advisory-committee/professor-olufunmilayo-ayoka-adebambo/
 https://orcid.org/0000-0001-8741-1264

References

Nigerian women academics
Women educators
University of Ibadan alumni
Living people
Year of birth missing (living people)
Yoruba people